The Naso Tjër Di Comarca is an indigenous region of Panama, located in the extreme northwest of the country, on the banks of the Teribe River and adjacent to the border between Costa Rica and Panama. The region is inhabited mainly by the Naso ethnic group, which is made up of about 5000 people.

History 
The Naso people, through their king, have been claiming in recent years the formation of an indigenous region, seeing that the other indigenous ethnic groups in Panama had their own, and also as a way to protect the cultural identity of that ethnicity.

On October 25, 2018, the National Assembly of Panama approved decree 656 that created the comarca; however, the president of Panama at that time, Juan Carlos Varela, vetoed it on December 14 of that same year, taking into account the concerns of environmental sectors that an indigenous region cannot be erected in a protected area and that it could be in conflict with articles 4 and 120 of the Constitution of Panama.

The case was taken to the Supreme Court of Justice of Panama, where on November 12, 2020, it issued a ruling indicating that the decree does not conflict with the Constitution and also added that the Naso people are one of the seven indigenous peoples that ancestrally have inhabited Panama, giving green light to the creation of the comarca.

On December 4, 2020, the current president of Panama, Laurentino Cortizo Cohen, sanctioned Law 188, thus allowing the creation of the new region.

Administrative divisions 
The capital of the comarca is the community of Sieyic, where the Naso king is settled.

The comarca is made up of the special district Naso Tjër Di, and in turn is divided into three corregimientos:

 Teribe
 San San Drui
 Bonyik

References 

 
Indigenous peoples in Panama
Comarcas of Panama
States and territories established in 2020
2020 establishments in Panama